Rainbows End is a 2006 science fiction novel by Vernor Vinge.  It was awarded the 2007 Hugo Award for Best Novel. The book is set in San Diego, California, in 2025, in a variation of the fictional world Vinge explored in his 2002 Hugo-winning novella "Fast Times at Fairmont High" and 2004's "Synthetic Serendipity". Vinge has tentative plans for a sequel, picking up some of the loose threads left at the end of the novel. The many technological advances depicted in the novel suggest that the world is undergoing ever-increasing change, following the technological singularity, a recurring subject in Vinge's fiction and nonfiction writing.

Plot summary
Thanks to advances in medical technology, Robert Gu is slowly recovering from Alzheimer's disease. As his faculties return, Robert (who has always been technophobic) must adapt to a  different world, where almost every object is networked and mediated-reality technology is commonplace.  Robert, formerly a world-renowned poet but with a notoriously mean-spirited personality, must also learn how to change and how to rebuild relationships with his estranged family. At the same time, Robert and his granddaughter Miri are drawn into a complex plot involving a traitorous intelligence officer, an intellect of frightening (and possibly superhuman) competence hiding behind an avatar of an anthropomorphic rabbit, and ominous new mind control technology with profound implications.

Augmented reality
In the novel, augmented reality is dominant, with humans interacting with virtual overlays of reality almost all of the time.  This is accomplished by wearing smart clothing providing gesture recognition and contact lenses that can overlay and replace what the eye would normally see with computer graphics, using advanced virtual retinal display (VRD) technology. In addition, haptic feedback is possible by overlaying graphics onto a physical machine such as a robot. This augmentation of reality is used for a variety of purposes:

 Commercial (large gaming areas sell gaming environments mixed with haptics). The Cheapnet, a free entry-level service offered by commercial vendors of gaming solutions, can in principle also be used to coordinate networked augmented reality representations across the globe. However, jitter and latency are considerable problems with this basic network when long distances are involved. In the novel, Robert Gu develops an algorithm that partially compensates for these technical deficiencies, and might ultimately allow the inclusion of haptics.
 Functional (maintenance workers, for example, have access to a blueprint or schematic of practically any location or object in their responsibility area)
 Communication (characters in the novel use live video chat and can send and receive "silent messages", an action known as "sming", through their VRDs). Individuals can be reached through a globally implemented unique personal identifier, the ENUM.
 Medical (doctors have access to a patient's vital signs)

There are characters who choose not to "wear" these virtual overlays, instead using laptops, considered relics in the novel. A user's skill in managing and producing augmented reality manifests itself in the details of the augmentation. For example, a character might project himself into a different room, but the shadows cast by this apparition, or the collision between the character and the furniture in the room might give away the apparition.

Belief circles
There are many realities to choose from in the novel; however, the largest and more robust of them are built by large user bases in the manner of a wiki or Second Life. The confederation of users that contribute to the virtual world is called a belief circle. Several belief circles are presented in the novel, including worlds based on authors such as H. P. Lovecraft, Terry Pratchett, and the fictional Jerzy Hacek. Also mentioned are worlds based on the artwork of M. C. Escher, and fictional entertainment companies such as SpielbergRowling. The Egan Soccer set piece can also be seen as a type of subscribed Belief Circle.

Themes
As in Vinge's other work, the concept of security in such an increasingly digital/virtual world with ubiquitous computing is a major theme of the novel. It examines the implications of rapid technological change that empowers both the disgruntled individuals who would threaten to disrupt society and those that would seek to stop them, and the implications for the age-old "who watches the watchers" issue at the interplay between surveillance (oversight) and sousveillance (undersight).

Characters
 Robert Gu – former Professor Emeritus of English, Alzheimer's survivor and Fairmont High School pupil
 Lena Gu - Robert's wife
 Robert Gu, Jr. (Bob) – Robert Gu's son, Lieutenant Colonel and Officer of the Watch in the US Marines
 Alice Gong Gu – Bob Gu's wife, Colonel and Auditor in the US Marines
 Miri Gu – Bob and Alice Gu's 13-year-old daughter, Fairmont High School pupil and Robert Gu's co-conspirator
 Juan Orozco – Fairmont High School pupil (age 14) and Robert Gu's technical advisor
 Xiu Xiang - former Professor of Computer Science and Fairmont High School pupil
 Winston Blount - former Dean at UC San Diego, colleague/rival of Robert Gu and Fairmont High School pupil  
 Zulfikar Sharif - Oregon State graduate student in literature who is writing a thesis on the works of Robert Gu.  
 Alfred Vaz – head of India's External Intelligence Agency
 Günberk Braun – European Union Intelligence Board agent
 Keiko Mitsuri – Japanese Intelligence agent
 Mr. Rabbit/Mysterious Stranger – unidentified intellect, appearing as a rabbit to Vaz, Braun and Mitsuri, and as a voice only to Robert Gu

Setting
Much of the novel's action occurs on the campus of the University of California, San Diego, especially in and around the Geisel Library, the architectural centerpiece of the campus.

Reception
 Hugo Award winner, 2007
 Locus Award winner, 2007
 John W. Campbell Memorial Award nominee, 2007

See also

 Augmented reality
 Ubiquitous computing

References

External links
 
 Column on Vinge and Rainbows End by John Tierney, New York Times, published August 25, 2008.
 The Coming Technological Singularity: How to Survive in the Post-Human Era, 1993 — An essay by Vinge about the possible causes and effects of technological singularity.
 "Synthetic Serendipity" — one of Vinge's two novellas set in the same world as Rainbows End, complete with illustrations (This novella is an extract from Rainbows End, although a few names and details have changed. You need to be a member of IEEE to read this extract).
 Mike Villas's World — IEEE article discussing the technology of the book.
 Rainbows End at Worlds Without End
 Google Glasses: Frightening or Fantastic?: NPR interview with Vernor Vinge (2012-02-23)

2006 American novels
2006 science fiction novels
Hugo Award for Best Novel-winning works
Novels about virtual reality
Novels by Vernor Vinge
Postcyberpunk novels
American science fiction novels
Fiction set in 2025
Novels set in California
Novels set in San Diego
Tor Books books
Books about Alzheimer's disease
Augmented reality in fiction
Fiction about mind control
Gesture recognition